Older's classification is a system of categorizing Colles' fractures, proposed in 1965. In the Older's classification system there are four types of fractures.

Classification
 Type 1: Dorsal angulation up to five degrees, radial length distal to ulna at least 7 mm.
 Type 2: Dorsal angulation, radial length 1 to 7 mm, no comminution.
 Type 3: Dorsal radius comminuted, radial length less than 4 mm,  distal  fragment slightly comminuted.
 Type 4: Marked comminution, radial length usually negative.

See also
 Frykman classification
 Gartland & Werley classification
 Lidström classification
 Nissen-Lie classification

References

Orthopedic classifications